Hylands Park is a public park in the London Borough of Havering in northwest Hornchurch, near to Romford. It is owned and managed by Havering London Borough Council and has Green Flag Award status.

There is also a ward of the London Borough of Havering called Hylands. The population at the 2011 Census was 13,334.

History
The land was purchased in 1920 by the owners of the Oak Public House in Victoria Road, Romford. In 1925 a trotting track was laid out on the land and a race meeting was held. Hornchurch Urban District Council was established in 1926 and in 1927 they purchased the land, to be laid out as public park. In October 1940 a Spitfire piloted by John McAdam from RAF Hornchurch narrowly avoided crashing in the crowded park, by crash landing in a gap between two houses.

Features
The former trotting track has been converted to a large oval path, which encircles cricket and football pitches. The entrance to Osborne Road features stone and wrought iron gates that were transferred from nearby Grey Towers, that was demolished in 1931. There is a rose garden.

Management
The park is owned and managed by Havering London Borough Council and has Green Flag Award status.

References

Parks and open spaces in the London Borough of Havering
Hornchurch